Dzmitry Varabyow (born 29 October 2001) is a Belarusian footballer who plays for Vitebsk.

References

External links

2001 births
Living people
Sportspeople from Vitebsk Region
Belarusian footballers
Association football defenders
FC Vitebsk players